Norman Rowley Wilson (14 January 1931 – 28 March 2018) was a New Zealand cricketer.

An all-rounder, Norm Wilson played five matches of first-class cricket for Northern Districts between 1958 and 1961, and Hawke Cup cricket for Northland between 1952 and 1970.

He captained Northland for seven years. He was a key person in the consolidation of the Northland Cricket Association, and served as committeeman, secretary, chairman, and finally, since 2002, the patron. He was the groundsman at Cobham Oval in Whangārei from the 1970s to the 2000s.

References

External links

1931 births
2018 deaths
New Zealand cricketers
Northern Districts cricketers
Cricketers from Auckland
New Zealand cricket administrators